Andrew Morgan may refer to:

 Andrew R. Morgan (born 1976), NASA astronaut
 Andrew Morgan (musician) (1901–1972), American jazz clarinetist and saxophonist
 Andrew D. Morgan (1859–1934), lawyer and president of Ilion, New York
 Andrew Price Morgan (1836–1907), American botanist
 Andrew Morgan (cross-country skier) (born 1934), British Olympic skier
 Andrew Morgan (cricketer) (born 1945), English cricketer